Carleton (or Carlton) was launched in New Brunswick or Nova Scotia in 1802. First she traded between Liverpool and North America. Then between 1806 and 1807 she made one voyage as a whaler to Van Diemen's Land. Afterwards she traded with the Caribbean and Malta, and was lost while sailing from Hull to Quebec.

Career
Carleton first appeared in Lloyd's Register (LR) in 1802.

Captain Sinclair Halcrow acquired a letter of marque on 11 December 1804.

Whaling voyage (1805–1807): Captain Halcrow sailed for the New South Wales Whale Fishery in 1805. In September 1805 Carleton, of Liverpool, was reported in England to have been at the River Plate earlier that year. By February 1806 or so Carlton was "all well" around Cape Horn. By July 1806 Carleton, "Malcrow", master, was at Van Diemen's Land. While at Hobart, Halcrow and Carlton went whaling in the Derwent. Carlton sailed from Hobart on 4 September with Captain and Mrs. Sladden from Hobart as passengers, Captain Sladden having been recalled to join his division at Chatham. 

Carleton was at Saint Helena on 15 December 1806, from the South Seas, and sailed again on the 28th. She arrived back at Liverpool on 18 February 1807.

Captain John Clint acquired a letter of marque on 24 May 1808. Captain Clint had already sailed to St Domingo, having returned to Liverpool on 23 April 1808 with  573 bales and 330 bags of cotton. He then sailed to Haiti. After sailing to Haiti, Carlton, Clint, master, sailed to Malta from Haiti. From Malta Carlton returned to Plymouth.

Fate
Then on 17 September 1809, Carlton, Proudlove, master, was at the Gulf of St Lawrence. The next report was that Carlton, Proudlove, from Hull to Quebec, was believed lost on the Banks of Newfoundland. Her entry in the 1810 issue of the Register of Shipping (RS) carried the annotation "LOST".

Citations

1802 ships
Ships built in Canada
Age of Sail merchant ships of England
Whaling ships
Maritime incidents in 1809